The Presbytery of Ross is one of the forty-six presbyteries of the Church of Scotland, being the local presbytery for Ross and Cromarty.  It was part of the Synod of Ross, Sutherland and Caithness until synods were abolished in the early 1990s.

The Presbytery represents and supervises 21 Church of Scotland congregations within the area, a significant improvement since 1693 when the Presbytery of Ross and Sutherland had only four Presbyterian ministers. It meets monthly and comprises Ministers and Elders of the member churches. Records of the Presbytery of Ross go back to at least 1693.

In its modern incarnation, the Presbytery of Ross was the result of the mergers of the Presbytery of Tain (which may have been in existence as early as 1588 although its own records are extant only from 1706) and the Presbytery of Chanonry and Dingwall in 1981.

In 2016 the Presbytery made history when a husband and wife were simultaneously ordained as ministers, a first for the Church of Scotland.

Derek Browning, the Moderator of the General Assembly of the Church of Scotland visited a number of the parishes in the Presbytery in 2018 as part of his duties.

Congregations

See also 
 List of Church of Scotland synods and presbyteries

References 

Presbyteries of the Church of Scotland